Ana Rajčević is a Serbian artist who is based in London and Berlin. She is known for works that sit at the intersection of fine arts, sculpture and body art. The Independent voted her one of the most promising artists from the University of the Arts in London in 2012.

Rajčević studied architecture in Serbia and Masters of Arts at the University of the Arts London, where she won the MA Award in 2012. That same year, she won the grand prize for her project "Animal - The Other Side of Evolution" at International Talent Support, in Trieste, Italy. Other awards include SEED Organization Award for Exceptional Talents by University of the Arts, London, UK, and Worth Project Grant by European Commission, Directorate-General for Enterprise and Industry in Belgium.

Rajcevic focuses on different ways of altering the body through complex pieces of adornment called 'prosthetic body-sculptures'. Her artistic practice confronts the question of how the ever-shifting material forms and substances in which human subjects are embodied configure understandings of ‘humanity itself. With a multi-disciplinary inquiry that combines experimental art and design with research in biomedicine, history, materials science, and psychology, Rajcevic creates unique wearable sculptures using most notably natural and synthetic polymers: wax, resin, silicon and rubber, as well as other novel materials and techniques.

Rajcevic exhibits internationally in such museums and galleries as the Smithsonian Design Museum - Cooper Hewitt (NYC), Museum Boijmans Van Beuningen (NL), Venice Biennale (IT), Den Bosch Museum, and have been published in The Independent, The Guardian, Wired, CNN, and Dazed & Confused, among others. In 2015 she has been elected a member of the Royal Society of Arts. Rajcevic regularly works and collaborates within the performing arts field, and her performance collaboration were shown in venues such as Sadler's Wells (UK), Haus der Kulturen der Welt (DE), and Münchner Kammerspiele (DE)..

Rajčević's wearable sculptures were part of the travelling Cooper Hewitt Design Triennial show in 2016. Her collection, "Animal: The Other Side of Evolution", was made of epoxy, acrylic resin, wax, fibreglass and silicone rubber, and refers to what she calls "prosthetic body sculpture". The work performs a double role. Once on the body, the sculpture becomes fused with the person, existing as artefact attached to the body. Once on its own, it becomes independent artwork exhibited in galleries. The exhibit addresses issues of evolution and according to the artist "it symbolizes an imagined evolution where humans have developed more in tune with their natural habitat. It suggests a world where mankind is not obsessed with overcoming nature for its own benefits, but instead allows himself to be shaped and transformed by novel natural processes.". In 2017, she participated in a group exhibition in Warsaw, Poland that questioned how art and fashion react to social, economic, and environmental upheavals.

References

External links
 http://anarajcevic.com
 https://www.instagram.com/
 https://www.facebook.com/anarajcevic.studio/

Serbian designers
Serbian artists
Artists from Berlin
Body art
Living people
Year of birth missing (living people)